This is a list of cruise ships, both those in service and those that have ceased to operate. Ocean liners are included on this list only if they also functioned as cruise ships. (See: list of ocean liners.)

As some cruise ships have operated under multiple names, all names will be listed in the Status section, along with the history of the vessel, under the vessel's current or most recent name. If a vessel is not currently operating as a cruise ship, only the most recent operation will be listed here.  Likewise, if a vessel fulfilled another role before becoming a cruise ship, the first entry for the vessel will occur when the vessel began its career as a cruise ship.

Classes of cruise ships
Cruise ship classes are sets of ships that have similar weight, height, length, passenger capacity and accommodation.

Belorussiya-class cruiseferry
Breakaway-class cruise ship
Concordia-class cruise ship
Conquest-class cruise ship
Destiny-class cruise ship
Dream-class cruise ship
Edge-class cruise ship
Excellence-class cruise ship
Fantasy-class cruise ship
Freedom-class cruise ship
Global-class cruise ship
Grand-class cruise ship
Holiday-class cruise ship
Icon-class cruise ship
Jewel-class cruise ship
Millennium-class cruise ship
Fantasia-class cruise ship
Lirica class
Oasis-class cruise ship
Project America
Project Icon cruise ship
Project Leonardo
Quantum-class cruise ship
Radiance-class cruise ship
Regatta-class cruise ship
Royal-class cruise ship
Seaside class cruise ship
Solstice-class cruise ship
Sovereign-class cruise ship
Spirit-class cruise ship
Sun-class cruise ship
Vision-class cruise ship
Vista Spirit hybrid class cruise ship
Vista-class cruise ship
Vista-class cruise ship (Carnival)
Voyager-class cruise ship

See also

 List of cruise lines
 List of largest cruise lines
 List of largest cruise ships
 List of largest passenger ships
 List of river cruise ships

Notes